Steve or Stephen Jennings may refer to:

Steve Jennings (footballer) (born 1984), English professional footballer
Steve Jennings (field hockey) (born 1969), former field hockey defender
Steve Jennings (taekwondo) (born 1981), GB Taekwondo National Team coach
Stephen Arthur Jennings (1915–1979), mathematician

See also
Stephen Jenyns (1450–1523), 16th century English nobleman

pl:Steve Jennings